Levrnaka is an uninhabited Croatian island in the Adriatic Sea located southwest of Kornat.

In the bay, there are several houses that are used summer only. Otherwise the island is without inhabitants.
The harbor is protected from all winds.

References

Islands of the Adriatic Sea
Islands of Croatia
Uninhabited islands of Croatia
Landforms of Šibenik-Knin County